Rank comparison chart of officers for air forces of Anglophone states.

Officers

References

Military ranks of Anglophone countries
Military comparisons